The 1947 Wichita Shockers football team was an American football team that represented the Municipal University of Wichita (now known as Wichita State University) as a member of the Missouri Valley Conference during the 1947 college football season. In its third and final season under head coach Ralph Graham, the team compiled a 7–4 record (2–1 against MVC opponents), finished second in the conference, lost to Pacific in the Raisin Bowl, and outscored opponents by a total of 271 to 115. They played their home games at Veterans Field, now known as Cessna Stadium.

The team was led on offense by halfback Linwood Sexton and fullback Anton Houlik. Sexton was one of the first African-American players in the Missouri Valley Conference.

Schedule

References

Wichita
Wichita State Shockers football seasons
Wichita Shockers football